Montréal-Dorion was a former provincial electoral district in the Montreal region of Quebec, Canada that elected members to the Legislative Assembly of Quebec.

It was created for the 1912 election from part of Hochelaga electoral district.  Its final election was in 1936.  It disappeared in the 1939 election and its successor electoral districts were Montréal–Jeanne-Mance and Montréal-Mercier.

Members of the Legislative Assembly

 Georges Mayrand, Liberal (1912–1919)
 Aurèle Lacombe, Parti ouvrier (1919–1923)
 Ernest Tétreau, Liberal Independent (1923–1927)
 Aldéric Blain, Conservative Party (1927–1931)
 Joseph-Achille Francoeur, Liberal (1931–1935)
 Grégoire Bélanger, Action liberale nationale – Union Nationale (1935–1939)

References
 Election results (National Assembly)
 Election results (QuebecPolitique.com)

Former provincial electoral districts of Quebec